Asteroids, including those in the asteroid belt have been suggested as a possible site of human colonization. Some of the driving forces behind this effort to colonize asteroids include the survival of humanity, as well as economic incentives associated with asteroid mining. The process of colonizing asteroids does have many obstacles that must be overcome for human habitation, including transportation distance, lack of gravity, temperature, radiation, and psychological issues.

Space habitats 

Most asteroids have a mixture of materials, that could be mined, and because these bodies do not have substantial gravity wells, it would require low delta-V to draw materials from them and haul them to a construction site.

There is estimated to be enough material in the main asteroid belt alone to build enough space habitats to equal the habitable surface area of 3,000 Earths.

Ceres 

Ceres is a dwarf planet in the asteroid belt. As it is cryovolcanic it has potential to be used for resources for colonization, and has a gravitational pull stronger than other bodies in the asteroid belt making surface colonization a more realistic possibility

Driving forces 

One of the primary arguments for space colonization is to ensure the long-term survival of the human species.  In the event of worldwide artificial or natural disaster a space colony would allow the human species to continue on.  Michael Griffin, the NASA administrator in 2006, stated the case as follows:“... the goal isn't just scientific exploration ... it's also about extending the range of human habitat out from Earth into the solar system as we go forward in time ... In the long run a single-planet species will not survive ... If we humans want to survive for hundreds of thousands or millions of years, we must ultimately populate other planets.” A specific argument for asteroid colonization is the potential economic gain from asteroid mining.  Asteroids contain a significant amount of valuable materials, including rare minerals and precious metals, which can be mined and transported back to Earth to be sold. With approximately as much iron as the world produces in 100,000 years, 16 Psyche is one such asteroid worth approximately $10 quintillion in metallic iron and nickel. NASA estimates there to be between 1.1 and 1.9 million asteroids within the asteroid belt larger than 1 kilometer in diameter and millions of smaller asteroids. Approximately 8% of those asteroids are similar in composition to 16 Psyche. One company, Planetary Resources, is already aiming to develop technologies with the goal of using them to mine asteroids. Planetary Resources estimates some 30-meter long asteroids to contain as much as $25 to $50 billion worth of platinum.

Transportation 
Interplanetary spaceflight is a challenge because the asteroid belt is far, hundreds of millions of miles or km away.  A human mission to Mars, tens of millions of miles or km, is similarly challenging.  The Mars rover mission, for example, took 253 days to get to Mars.  Russia, China, and the European Space Agency ran an experiment, called MARS-500, between 2007 and 2011 to gauge the physical and psychological limitations of crewed space flight.  The experiment concluded that 18 months of solitude was the limit for a crewed space mission.  With current technology the journey to the asteroid belt would be greater than 18 months, suggesting that a crewed mission may be beyond our current technological capabilities.

Landing 

Asteroids are not large enough to produce significant gravity, making it difficult to land a spacecraft. Humans have yet to land a spacecraft on an asteroid in the asteroid belt, but unmanned spacecraft have temporarily landed on a few asteroids, the first of which in 2001 was 433 Eros, a NEA from the Amor group, more recently 162173 Ryugu, another NEA of the Apollo group. This was part of the Hayabusa2 mission that was conducted by the Japanese Space Agency.  The landing used four solar ionic thrusters and four reaction wheels for orientation control and orbit control of the spacecraft to land on Ryugu.  These technologies may be applied to complete a successful similar landing in the asteroid belt.

Mining the Asteroid Belt from Mars

Since Mars is much closer to the Asteroid belt than Earth is, it would take less Delta-v to get to the Asteroid belt and return minerals to Mars.  One hypothesis is that the origin of the Moons of Mars (Phobos and Deimos) are actually Asteroid captures from the Asteroid belt. 16 Psyche in the main belt could have over $10,000 Quadrillion Dollars worth of minerals.  NASA is planning a mission for October 10, 2023 for the Psyche orbiter to launch and get to the asteroid by August 2029 to study. 511 Davida could have $27 quadrillion Dollars worth of minerals and resources. Using the moon Phobos to launch spacecraft is energetically favorable and a useful location from which to dispatch missions to main belt asteroids. Mining the asteroid belt from Mars and its moons could help in the Colonization of Mars.

Phobos as a space elevator for Mars

Phobos is Synchronously orbiting Mars, where the same face stays facing the planet at ~6,028 km above the Martian surface.  A space elevator could extend down from Phobos to Mars 6,000 km, about 28 kilometers from the surface, and just out of the atmosphere of Mars. A similar space elevator cable could extend out 6,000 km the opposite direction that would counterbalance Phobos.  In total the space elevator would extend out over 12,000 km which would be below Areostationary orbit of Mars (17,032 km). A rocket launch would still be needed to get the rocket and cargo to the beginning of the space elevator 28 km above the surface.  The surface of Mars is rotating at 0.25 km/s at the equator and the bottom of the space elevator would be rotating around Mars at 0.77 km/s, so only 0.52 km/s of Delta-v would be needed to get to the space elevator. Phobos orbits at 2.15 km/s and the outer most part of the space elevator would rotate around Mars at 3.52 km/s.

Challenges for human habitation

Gravity 
Lack of gravity has many adverse effects on human biology. Transitioning gravity fields has the potential to impact spatial orientation, coordination, balance, locomotion, and induce motion sickness. Asteroids, without artificial gravity, have relatively little gravity in comparison to earth. Without gravity working on the human body, bones lose minerals, and bone density decreases by 1% monthly. In comparison, the rate of bone loss for the elderly is between 1-1.5% yearly. The excretion of calcium from bones in space also places those in low gravity at a higher risk of kidney stones. Additionally, a lack of gravity causes fluids in the body to shift towards the head, possibly causing pressure in the head and vision problems.

Overall physical fitness tends to decrease as well, and proper nutrition becomes much more important. Without gravity, muscles are engaged less and overall movement is easier. Without intentional training, muscle mass, cardiovascular conditioning and endurance will decrease.

Artificial gravity 
Artificial gravity offers a solution to the adverse effects of zero gravity on the human body. One proposition to implement artificial gravity on asteroids, investigated in a study conducted by researchers at the University of Vienna, involves hollowing out and rotating a celestial body. Colonists would then live within the asteroid, and the centrifugal force would simulate Earth's gravity. The researchers found that while it may be unclear as to whether asteroids would be strong enough maintain the necessary spin rate, they could not rule out such a project if the dimensions and composition of the asteroid were within acceptable levels.

Currently, there are no practical large-scale applications of artificial gravity for spaceflight or colonization efforts due to issues with size and cost. However, a variety of research labs and organizations have performed a number of tests utilizing human centrifuges to study the effects of prolonged sustained or intermittent artificial gravity on the body in an attempt to determine feasibility for future missions such as long-term spaceflight and space colonization.  A research team at the University of Colorado Boulder found that they were able to make all participants in their study feel comfortable at approximately 17 revolutions per minute in a human centrifuge, without the motion sickness that tends to plague most trials of small-scale applications of artificial gravity. This offers an alternative method which may be more feasible considering the significantly reduced cost in comparison to larger structures.

Temperature 
Most asteroids are located in the asteroid belt, between Mars and Jupiter. This is a cold region, with temperatures ranging from -73 degrees Celsius to -103 degrees.  Human life will require a consistent energy source for warmth.

Radiation 
In space, cosmic rays and solar flares create a lethal radiation environment. Cosmic radiation has the potential to increase risk of heart disease, cancer, central nervous system disorder, and acute radiation syndrome. On Earth, we are protected by a magnetic field and our atmosphere, but asteroids lack this defense.

One possibility for defense against this radiation is living inside of an asteroid. It is estimated that humans would be sufficiently protected from radiation by burrowing 100 meters deep inside of an asteroid. However, the composition of asteroids creates an issue for this solution. Many asteroids are loosely organized rubble piles with very little structural integrity.

Psychology 
Space travel has a huge impact on human psychology, including changes to brain structure, neural interconnectivity, and behavior.

Cosmic radiation has the ability to impact the brain, and has been studied extensively on rats and mice. These studies show the animals suffer from decreases in spatial memory, neural interconnectivity, and memory. Additionally, the animals had an increase in anxiety and fear.

The isolation of space and difficulty sleeping in the environment also contribute to psychological impacts. The difficulty of speaking with those on earth can contribute to loneliness, anxiety, and depression. A Russian study simulated the psychological impacts of extended space travel. Six healthy males from various countries but with similar educational backgrounds to astronauts lived inside an enclosed module for 520 days in 2010–11. The members of the survey reported symptoms of moderate depression, abnormal sleep cycles, insomnia, and physical exhaustion.

In addition, NASA reports that missions on the global scale have ended or been halted due to mental issues. Some of these issues include shared mental delusions, depression, and becoming distressed from failed experiments.

However, in many astronauts, space travel can actually have a positive mental impact. Many astronauts report an increase of appreciation for the planet, purpose, and spirituality. This mainly results from the view of Earth from space.

See also
 16 Psyche
 Colonization of Mars
 Asteroid mining
 Mining the Asteroid Belt from Mars
 Space colonization
 Asteroid belt
 Space habitat
 Exploration of 16 Psyche - mission scheduled for 2023 launch and 2029 arrival

References

Asteroids
+Asteroids
Asteroid mining